The Abbey Church of St Mary the Virgin, Tewkesbury–commonly known as Tewkesbury Abbey–is located in the English county of Gloucestershire. A former Benedictine monastery, it is now a parish church. Considered one of the finest examples of Norman architecture in Britain, it has the largest Romanesque crossing tower in Europe.

Tewkesbury had been a centre for worship since the 7th century. A priory was established there in the 10th century. The present building was started in the early 12th century. It was unsuccessfully used as a sanctuary in the Wars of the Roses. After the Dissolution of the Monasteries, Tewkesbury Abbey became the parish church for the town. George Gilbert Scott led the restoration of the building in the late 19th century. The church and churchyard within the abbey precincts include tombs and memorials to many of the aristocracy of the area.

Services have been high church but now include Parish Eucharist, choral Mass, and Evensong. These services are accompanied by one of the church's three organs and choirs. There is a ring of twelve bells, hung for change ringing.

History

The Chronicle of Tewkesbury records that the first Christian worship was brought to the area by Theoc, a missionary from Northumbria, who built his cell in the mid-7th century near a gravel spit where the Severn and Avon rivers join. The cell was succeeded by a monastery in 715, but nothing remaining of it has been identified.

In the 10th century the religious foundation at Tewkesbury became a priory subordinate to the Benedictine Cranborne Abbey in Dorset. In 1087, William the Conqueror gave the manor of Tewkesbury to his cousin, Robert Fitzhamon, who, with Giraldus, Abbot of Cranborne, founded the present abbey in 1092. Building of the present Abbey church did not start until 1102, employing Caen stone imported from Normandy and floated up the Severn.

Robert Fitzhamon was wounded at Falaise in Normandy in 1105 and died two years later, but his son-in-law, Robert FitzRoy, the natural son of Henry I who was made Earl of Gloucester, continued to fund the building work. The Abbey's greatest single later patron was Lady Eleanor le Despenser, last of the De Clare heirs of FitzRoy. In the High Middle Ages, Tewkesbury became one of the richest abbeys of England.

After the Battle of Tewkesbury in the Wars of the Roses on 4 May 1471, some of the defeated Lancastrians sought sanctuary in the abbey. The victorious Yorkists, led by King Edward IV, forced their way into the abbey; the resulting bloodshed caused the building to be closed for a month until it could be purified and re-consecrated.

At the Dissolution of the Monasteries, the last abbot, John Wakeman, surrendered the abbey to the commissioners of King Henry VIII on 9 January 1539. As a former monk of an endowed community, he received an annuity. This was the relatively large sum of 400 marks, but would have ceased when he was ordained as the first Bishop of Gloucester in September 1541. Meanwhile, the people of Tewkesbury saved the abbey from destruction. Insisting that it was their parish church which they had the right to keep, they bought it from the Crown for the value of its bells and lead roof which would have been salvaged and melted down, leaving the structure a roofless ruin. The price came to £453.

The bells merited their own free-standing belltower, an unusual feature in English sites. After the Dissolution, the bell-tower was used as the gaol for the borough until it was demolished in the late 18th century.

The central stone tower was originally topped with a wooden spire, which collapsed in 1559 and was never rebuilt. Restoration undertaken in the late 19th century under Sir George Gilbert Scott was reopened on 23 September 1879. Work continued under the direction of his son John Oldrid Scott until 1910 and included the rood screen of 1892.

Flood waters from the nearby River Severn reached inside the Abbey during severe floods in 1760, and again on 23 July 2007.

Construction time-line

 23 October 1121 – the choir consecrated
 1150 – tower and nave completed
 1178 – large fire necessitated some rebuilding
 ~1235 – Chapel of St Nicholas built
 ~1300 – Chapel of St. James built
 1321–1335 – choir rebuilt with radiating chantry chapels
 1349–59 – tower and nave vaults rebuilt; the lierne vaults of the nave replacing wooden roofing
 1400–1410 – cloisters rebuilt
 1438 – Chapel of Isabel (Countess of Warwick) built
 1471 – Battle of Tewkesbury; bloodshed within church so great that it is closed for purification

The building

The church itself is one of the finest Norman buildings in England. Its massive crossing tower is noted in Pevsner's Buildings of England to be "probably the largest and finest Romanesque example in England". Fourteen of England's cathedrals are of smaller dimensions, while only Westminster Abbey contains more medieval church monuments.

Notable monuments
Notable church monuments surviving in Tewkesbury Abbey include:
 1107 – when the abbey's founder Robert Fitzhamon died in 1107, he was buried in the chapter house while his son-in-law Robert FitzRoy, Earl of Gloucester (an illegitimate son of King Henry I), continued building the abbey
 1375 – Edward Despenser, Lord of the Manor of Tewkesbury, is remembered today chiefly for the effigy on his monument, which shows him in full colour kneeling on top of the canopy of his chantry, facing toward the high altar
 1395 – Robert Fitzhamon's remains were moved into a new chapel built as his tomb
 1471 – a brass plate on the floor in the centre of the sanctuary marks the grave of Edward of Westminster, Prince of Wales, the son of King Henry VI and end of the Lancastrian line, who was killed in the Battle of Tewkesbury – the only Prince of Wales ever to die in battle. He was aged only 17 at his death.
 1478 – the bones of George, Duke of Clarence (brother of Edward IV and Richard III), and his wife Isabel (daughter of "Warwick, the Kingmaker") are housed behind a glass window in a wall of their inaccessible burial vault behind the high altar
 1539 – the cadaver monument which Abbot Wakeman had erected for himself is only a cenotaph because he was not buried there
 Also buried in the abbey are several members of the Despenser, de Clare and Beauchamp families, all of whom were generous benefactors of the abbey. Such members include Henry de Beauchamp, 1st Duke of Warwick, and his wife, Cecily Neville, Duchess of Warwick, sister of "Warwick, the Kingmaker".

Other burials

Brictric, a late-Saxon thegn
John Courtenay, 15th Earl of Devon, (c. 1435 – 4 May 1471)
Edmund Beaufort (died 1471)
John Beaufort, Marquess of Dorset
Richard de Clare, 3rd Earl of Hertford
Maud (or Matilda) de Burgh (c. 1288–1320), his wife
Isabel Marshal, her heart
John Courtenay, 7th Earl of Devon
Henry Beauchamp, 1st Duke of Warwick
Guy de Bryan, 1st Baron Bryan
Eleanor de Clare
Thomas le Despenser, 1st Earl of Gloucester
Gilbert de Clare, 5th Earl of Gloucester
Richard de Clare, 6th Earl of Gloucester
Gilbert de Clare, 7th Earl of Gloucester
Gilbert de Clare, 8th Earl of Gloucester
Amice FitzWilliam, 4th Countess of Gloucester (c. 1160–1220) 
Elizabeth de Burghersh, 3rd Baroness Burghersh
Hugh le Despenser, 1st Earl of Winchester
Hugh Despenser the Younger
Richard de Beauchamp, 1st Earl of Worcester, (c.1394 – 18 March 1421/1422)
Isabel le Despenser, Countess of Worcester
Richard le Despenser, 4th Baron Burghersh
Isabel le Despenser, Countess of Arundel
William la Zouche, 3rd Baron Zouche (c. 1355 – 4 May 1396)
Elizabeth le Despenser
Hugh le Despencer, Baron le Despencer (1338)
Elizabeth Montague (d.1359), his wife
Samuel Jones (academy tutor)

The Three Organs

The Abbey's 17th-century organ – known as the Milton Organ – was originally made for Magdalen College, Oxford, by Robert Dallam. After the English Civil War it was removed to the chapel of Hampton Court Palace, where the poet Milton may have played it. It came to Tewkesbury in 1737. Since then, it has undergone several major rebuilds. A specification of the organ can be found on the National Pipe Organ Register.
In the North Transept is the stupendous Grove Organ, built by the short-lived partnership of Michell & Thynne in 1885: .
The third organ in the Abbey is the Elliott chamber organ of 1812, mounted on a movable platform: .

List of organists

James Cleavely, 1737–1767
James Edward Chandler, 1767–1798
Nathaniel Chandler, 1798–1847
Nathaniel Chandler White, 1847–1857
Thomas Vale, 1857
Jabez Jones, 1857–1858
Mr. Caseley, 1858
R.M. Ellis, 1858–1861
Edward Gillman, 1861–1867
John Thorniloe Horniblow, 1867–1878
Henry Rogers, 1878–1880
Daniel Hemmingway, 1881–1891
Samuel Bath, 1891–1900
Alfred W. V. Vine, 1900–1910
Capt. Percy Baker, 1910–1943
Revd. Claude William Parnell, 1916–1918 (deputising for Percy Baker)
Michael Stockwin Howard, 1943–1944
Huskisson Stubington, 1944–1966
Michael Peterson, 1966–1985
John Belcher, 1985–1996 (formerly organist of St Asaph Cathedral)
Carleton Etherington, 1996–present

List of assistant organists
Leonard William Tracy Arkell 1910–1912
Richard Abdiel Chorley 1950–1985

The bells

The bells at the Abbey were overhauled in 1962. The ring is now made up of twelve bells, hung for change ringing, cast in 1962, by John Taylor & Co of Loughborough. The inscriptions of the old 5th and 10th bells are copied in facsimile onto the new bells. The bells have modern cast iron headstocks and all run on self-aligning ball bearings. They are hung in the north-east corner of the tower, and the ringing chamber is partitioned off from the rest of the tower. A semitone bell (Flat 6th) and extra treble were also cast by Taylor of Loughborough in 1991 and 2020 respectively, making a total of 14 available for change ringing.

The Old Clock Bells are the old 6th (Abraham Rudhall II, 1725), the old 7th (Abraham Rudhall I, 1696), the old 8th (Abraham Rudhall I, 1696) and the old 11th (Abraham Rudhall I, 1717). In St Dunstan's Chapel, at the east end of the Abbey, is a small disused bell inscribed T. MEARS FECT. 1837.

The Abbey bells are rung from 10:15am to 11:00am every Sunday except the first Sunday of the month (a quarter peal). There is also ringing for Evensong from 4:00pm to 5:00pm, except on the third Sunday (a quarter peal) and most fifth Sundays. Practice takes place each Thursday from 7:30pm to 9:00pm.

Churchyard
The churchyard contains war graves of two World War II Royal Air Force personnel.

Abbey precincts
The market town of Tewkesbury developed to the north of the abbey precincts, of which vestiges remain in the layout of the streets and a few buildings: the Abbot's gatehouse, the Almonry barn, the Abbey Mill, Abbey House, the present vicarage and some half-timbered dwellings in Church Street. The Abbey now sits partly isolated in lawns, like a cathedral in its cathedral close, for the area surrounding the Abbey is protected from development by the Abbey Lawn Trust, originally funded by a United States benefactor in 1962.

Abbots

Gerald of Avranches (1102–1109). Previously served as Abbot of Cranborne, when Tewkesbury was a dependent cell. Gerald was made Abbot when the abbey was transferred to Tewkesbury by William Rufus and Robert Fitz Haimon. He also previously served as chaplain to Hugh, Earl of Chester
Robert (1109–1123)
Benedict (1124–1137) Previously served as Prior of Tewkesbury
Roger (1137–1161)
Fromund (1162–1178)
Robert (1182–1183)
The Bishop of St. David's held the priory for three years (1183–1186)
Alan of Tewkesbury, (1186–1202). His tomb is in the south ambulatory of the choir
Walter (1202–1213). Previously served as the Sacrist at Tewkesbury
Previously served as Prior of Tewkesbury
Peter of Worcester (1216–1232)
Robert (1232–1254). Previously served as Prior of Tewkesbury. A tomb thought to be his is in the south ambulatory
Previously served as Prior of St James' Priory, Bristol
Richard of Norton (1276–1282)
John de Cotes (1330–1347). Previously served as Prior of Tewkesbury
Thomas de Leghe (1347–1361)
Thomas de Chesterton (1361–1389)
Thomas Parker (1389–1420)
John de Abingdon (1444–1452)
John Wyche alias John Wakeman (1534–1540). Last Abbot before the surrender of the monastery on 9 January 1540. Appointed Bishop of Gloucester in September 1541

Choirs
The Abbey possesses, in effect, two choirs. The Abbey Choir sings at Sunday services, with children (boys and girls) and adults in the morning, and adults in the evening. Tewkesbury Abbey Schola Cantorum is a professional choir of men and boys based at Dean Close Preparatory School and sings at weekday Evensongs as well as occasional masses and concerts. The Abbey School Tewkesbury, which educated, trained and provided choristers to sing the service of Evensong from its foundation in 1973 by Miles Amherst, closed in 2006; the choir was then re-housed at Dean Close School, Cheltenham, and renamed the Tewkesbury Abbey Schola Cantorum.

Worship

For the most part, worship at the Abbey has been emphatically High Anglican. However, in more recent times there has been an acknowledgement of the value of less solemn worship, and this is reflected in the two congregational services offered on Sunday mornings. The first of these (at 9.15am) is a Parish Eucharist, with modern language and an informal atmosphere; a parish breakfast is typically served after this service. The main Sung Eucharist at 11am is solemn and formal, including a choral Mass; traditional language is used throughout, and most parts of the service are indeed sung, including the Collect and Gospel reading. Choral Evensong is sung on Sunday evenings, and also on Monday, Tuesday, Thursday and Friday during the week. A said Eucharist also takes place every day of the week, at varying times, and alternating between traditional and modern language. Each summer since 1969 (with the exception of 2007 when the town was hit by floods) the Abbey has played host to Musica Deo Sacra, a festival combining music and liturgy. Photography in the Abbey is restricted.

References

Morris, Richard K. & Shoesmith, Ron (editors) (2003) Tewkesbury Abbey: history, art and architecture. Almeley: Logaston Press

External links

 Official site
 Tewkesbury Medieval Town Showcase

8th-century establishments in England
Anglo-Saxon monastic houses
12th-century church buildings in England
Benedictine monasteries in England
Church of England church buildings in Gloucestershire
Christian monasteries established in the 8th century
Diocese of Gloucester
Grade I listed monasteries
Grade I listed churches in Gloucestershire
History of Gloucestershire
Monasteries in Gloucestershire
Abbey
Tourist attractions in Gloucestershire
1530s disestablishments in England
Burial sites of the De Clare family
Burial sites of the House of Neville
Monasteries dissolved under the English Reformation
Burial sites of the House of Lancaster
Burial sites of the House of York
Churches completed in 715